The 2012 WAFL Grand Final was an Australian rules football game contested between the Claremont Football Club and the East Fremantle Football Club on Sunday 23 September 2012 at Patersons Stadium, to determine the premier team of the West Australian Football League (WAFL) for the 2012 season. Claremont won an exciting game by 26 points - 18.16 (124) to 15.8 (98) - and Paul Medhurst of Claremont was awarded the Simpson Medal. The win, which gave Claremont's its 12th WAFL premiership, was also the first time the Tigers had won successive flags since their 1938-1940 hat-trick.

Background
Claremont, the reigning premiers, finished the home-and-away rounds on top of the ladder with 15 wins and a large percentage. The Tigers advanced directly to the Grand Final after defeating  in the Second Semi-final.

East Fremantle finished third at the end of the home-and-away rounds with 14 wins. The Sharks defeated  in the First Semi-final and then Swan Districts in the Preliminary Final to advance to the Grand Final. This was the first time the Sharks had made it to the Grand Final since 2000, and their most recent Grand Final victory was in 1998.

In the lead-up to the Grand Final, Claremont captain Andrew Browne failed a fitness test on his injured left hamstring, and deputy Luke Blackwell was appointed to lead the side.

Teams

Claremont

East Fremantle

Match report
East Fremantle closed to within one point at the start of the final quarter when Young kicked his second, but Claremont managed to steady and kick five of the last six goals to run out comfortable winners in the end.

Match Details

References

West Australian Football League Grand Finals
WAFL